Nilachaley Mahaprabhu was a 1957 Indian Bengali biographical film directed by Kartik Chattopadhyay, based on the life of 15th-century mystic Chaitanya Mahaprabhu, who started his spiritual journey and Hindu reform movement, part of the Bhakti movement during his years at Nilachal, the shrine of Jagannath at Puri. It stars Asim Kumar in the titular role with Dipti Roy, Sumitra Devi, Ahindra Choudhury, Bhanu Bandyopadhyay, Nripati Chattopadhyay and Chhabi Biswas in supporting roles.

At the beginning of his career, a 20-year-old Soumitra Chatterjee was rejected in his screen test for the film by director Kartik Chattopadhyay, he later made his debut with Apur Sansar (1959). The film continues to be a popular amongst Chaitanya and Krishna devotees and ISKCON followers.

Cast
 Asim Kumar as Chaitanya
 Dipti Roy as Vishnupriya
 Ahindra Choudhury  
 Dhiraj Bhattacharya
 Nitish Mukhapadhyay
 Kanu Banerjee
 Gurudas Bandyopadhyay
 Bhanu Bandopadhyay
 Nripati Chattopadhyay
 Chhabi Biswas
 Sumitra Devi
 Molina Devi
 Padma Devi
 Shikharani
 Sumita Bandha
 Jnanadakakuti
 Suruchi Sengupta
 Kumari Indrani

References

External links
 

Bengali-language Indian films
Indian biographical films
Bengali-language biographical films
Films set in the 15th century
Biographical films about religious leaders
Indian historical films
Jagannath
Films about Hinduism
Indian black-and-white films
Films set in Odisha
1950s Bengali-language films
1950s biographical films
1950s historical films